The third season of the action-adventure television series The A-Team premiered in the United States on NBC on September 18, 1984, and concluded on May 14, 1985, consisting of 25 episodes.

Cast
 George Peppard as Lieutenant Colonel/Colonel John "Hannibal" Smith
 Dirk Benedict as First Lieutenant Templeton "Faceman" Peck
 Dwight Schultz as Captain H. M. Murdock
 Mr. T as Sergeant First Class Bosco Albert "B. A." (Bad Attitude) Baracus

Opening credits
Hannibal launches the cannon at a pursuing Jeep in Season 1's "Mexican Slayride" (as previous version, note that Melinda Culea can still briefly seen behind Hannibal).
The helicopter chase from Season 2's "The Battle of Bel-Air".
Hannibal dressed as the aquamaniac, had his face door opened, and Face gave him a cigar, in the Season 2 episode "Steel" (Note: this version played backwards on the actual episode: Face removes the cigar, and closes the door).
Hannibal disguised as a fisherman in Season 2's "Pure Dee Poison".
Hannibal sends a bulldozer ball crashing down on the villains' car in the Season 2 episode "Steel".
Face saying goodbye to sister Teresa, at the end of Season 2's "The Only Church in Town" (as previous version).
A cylon walking past cases Face to double take in the Season 2 episode "Steel" (as previous version, now with accompanying sound effect).
Face and a guest at Face's scam film opening in Season 2's feature-length two-part episode "When You Comin' Back Range Rider?".
Face fires his gun, looks behind him and smiles, in the Season 3 episode "The Bells of St. Mary's" (Note: the shot is edited differently, and Face does not look behind him).
A shot of Face, while trying to con mobster Crazy Tommy T from the Season 2 episode "Steel".
A coffin has raised from a hearse, while Murdock bursts out and fires his gun in the Season 2 episode "Chopping Spree".
Murdock reveals himself as the bride in Season 1's "Til' Death Do Us Part" (as previous version).
Murdock emerges his disguise as a bush, in Season 2's feature-length two-part episode "When You Comin' Back Range Rider?"
B.A. bursts into the Mexican bar while making his entrance in Season 1's "Mexican Slayride" (as previous version).
B.A. wears a construction hat while crushing a car on a modified construction vehicle in Season 2's "Steel".
B.A. winks at the end of Season 2's "Chopping Spree".
B.A. turns his head to see what Hannibal is doing in Season 1's "Mexican Slayride" (as previous version).
The armored car bursts out of the back of a truck in the Season 2 episode "Bad Time on the Border".
The helicopter (piloted by Murdock) chases the villain's car from the Season 2 episode "Recipe for Heavy Bread".
A Jeep flips over as Hannibal throws a grenade in Season 1's "Mexican Slayride" (as previous version).

Episodes

The A-Team seasons
1984 American television seasons
1985 American television seasons